This article is about the particular significance of the decade 1860 - 1869 to Wales and its people.

Incumbents
Prince of Wales – Albert Edward
Princess of Wales – Alexandra (from 1863)

Events
1860
1861
1862
1863
1864
1865
1866
1867
1868
1869

Arts and literature

Awards
National Eisteddfod of Wales 
1861 - Aberdare
1862 - Caernarfon
1863 - Swansea
1864 - Llandudno
1865 - Aberystwyth
1866 - Chester
1867 - Carmarthen - A crown is presented for the first time
1868 - Ruthin - The Eisteddfod Council is disbanded
1869 - Holywell

New books
R. D. Blackmore - Clara Vaughan (1864)
George Borrow - Wild Wales (1862)
Rhoda Broughton - Cometh up as a Flower (1867)
Richard Davies (Mynyddog) - Caneuon Mynyddog (1866)
Huw Derfel - Llawlyfr Carnedd Llywelyn (1864)
Robert Jones Derfel - Traethodau ac Areithiau (1864)
John Ceiriog Hughes
Oriau'r Hwyr (1860)
Oriau'r Bore (1862)
Cant o Ganeuon (1863)
Y Bardd a'r Cerddor (1865)
Oriau eraill (1868)
David Watkin Jones (Dafydd Morgannwg) - Yr Ysgol Farddol (1869)
William Rees (Gwilym Hiraethog) - Emmanuel (1861)
William Thomas (Islwyn) - Caniadau (1867)
Robert Williams (Trebor Mai)
Fy Noswyl (1861)
Geninen (1869)
Alfred Russel Wallace
The Origin of Human Races and the Antiquity of Man Deduced from the Theory of 'Natural Selection (1864)
The Malay Archipelago (1867)

Music
William Griffiths (Ifander) - Gwarchae Harlech (cantata) (1864)
Hugh Jerman - Deus Misereatur (1861)
Henry Brinley Richards - "God Bless the Prince of Wales" (1863)
John Thomas (Pencerdd Gwalia)
Llewelyn (cantata) (1863)
The Bride of Neath Valley (cantata) (1866)

Sport
1860 - The first bowls club in Wales is founded at Abergavenny.

Births
1860
date unknown - Sir William Price (died 1938)
1861
date unknown
John Edward Lloyd, historian (died 1947)
Thomas Mardy Rees, writer (died 1953)
1862
date unknown - John Daniel Evans, Patagonia settler
1863
January 17 - David Lloyd George, politician (died 1945)
March 3 - Arthur Machen, writer (died 1947)
1864
January 8 - Prince Albert Victor, first child of the Prince and Princess of Wales (died 1892)
October 17 - Sir John Morris-Jones, grammarian (died 1929)
date unknown - Charles Alfred Howell Green, first Bishop of Monmouth (died 1944)
1865
June 3 - Prince George, second son of the Prince and Princess of Wales and himself Prince of Wales 1901–1910 (later George V)
date unknown - William Brace, politician (died 1947)
1866
October 12 - James Ramsay MacDonald, politician (died 1937)
date unknown - John Gruffydd Moelwyn Hughes, poet and hymn-writer (died 1944)
1867
May 2 - Eliseus Williams (Eifion Wyn), poet (died 1926)
May 13 - Frank Brangwyn, artist (died 1956)
May 26 - Mary of Teck, later Princess of Wales 1901-1910 (died 1953)
September 29 - John Richard Williams (J.R. Tryfanwy), poet (died 1924)
1869
September 6 - Walford Davies, composer (died 1944)
date unknown
Thomas Rees, theologian (died 1926)
Osbert Fynes-Clinton, dialectologist (died 1941)

Deaths
1860
May 4 - William Ormsby-Gore, politician (born 1779)
July 17 - Beti Cadwaladr, Crimea nurse (born 1789)
1861
May 8 - Thomas Lloyd-Mostyn, politician (born 1830)
1862
January 3 - Dan Jones, Mormon missionary (born 1810)
date unknown - John Williams (Ab Ithel), antiquary
1863
April - George Cornewall Lewis, statesman (born 1806)
1864
March 11 - Richard Roberts, engineer
August 1 - Thomas Rees, Unitarian minister (born 1777)
date unknown
Evan Davies, missionary
Mary Jones, early owner of a Welsh Bible
1865
February 21 - Stapleton Cotton, military leader (born 1773)
1866
January 27 - John Gibson, sculptor (born 1790)
1867
April 27 - Benjamin Hall, 1st Baron Llanover, industrialist (born 1802)
May 23 - William Crawshay II, industrialist (born 1788)
1868
June 22 - Owain Meirion, poet (born 1803)
date unknown - Dafydd Jones (Dewi Dywyll), balladeer (born 1803)
1869
March 31 - David Rees (Y Cynhyrfwr), Nonconformist leader and author
date unknown - John Jones (Talhaiarn), poet (born 1810)